Nisbet House is a 17th-century mansion in the Scottish Borders. It was built in about 1630 by Sir Alexander Nisbet, ancestor of the heraldic authority Alexander Nisbet (1657–1725). Architectural evidence suggests that the building incorporates, at its eastern end, a square pele tower that was the former house. The house is protected as a category A listed building.

History
The Nisbet family built two fortified houses or pele towers in the 12th century, East Nisbet and West Nisbet. East Nisbet, now known as Allanbank, was located on the Blackadder Water near Allanton, although the original tower no longer exists. Wester Nisbet remains, and was extended in the 1630s to form the bulk of the present house. The laird at the time was Sir Alexander Nisbet of that Ilk (c. 1580–1660). Sir Alexander Nisbet overextended his finances in supporting Charles I in the Civil War, and was forced to sell the property to John Ker in 1652. John's son by his second wife, George Carre, Lord Nisbet, was born here around 1700.

A square tower, with fine interior plasterwork, in the classical style of William Adam was added to the west end in 1774. The house remained with Ker descendants (latterly in the person of Lord Sinclair) until the 1950s, when the estate was sold to Lord Brocket. After partial modernisation, the house was sold again in the mid-1960s to a local farmer, and remained unoccupied until its recent and comprehensive restoration as a private residence.

Nisbet estate
The former estate contains a very small mill, an 18th-century U-plan stable range (now converted into homes), and a scattering of cottages and farmhouses. Dunse Spa, a source of mineral water in the 18th century, is just to the north of the Nisbet estate and the spa house still stands.

Gallery
Photographs of Nisbet House taken by Robert Chancellor Nesbit in the 1930s.

See also
List of places in the Scottish Borders
Battle of Nesbit Moor (1402)
Clan Nesbitt

References

Sources

External links
The Nesbitt/Nisbet Society Website — United Kingdom
The Nesbitt-Nisbet Society Website — North America

Berwickshire
Houses in the Scottish Borders
Castles in the Scottish Borders
Category A listed buildings in the Scottish Borders
Listed houses in Scotland